Protapes is a genus of marine bivalve molluscs in the family Veneridae.  It includes the following species:
Protapes brownianus (Preston, 1906)
Protapes cor (G. B. Sowerby II, 1853)
Protapes gallus (Gmelin, 1791), the type species
Protapes monstrosus (Römer, 1870)
Protapes motsei J. Chen, S.-P. Zhang & L.-F. Kong, 2014
Protapes rhamphodes (P. G. Oliver & Glover, 1996)
Protapes roemeri M. Huber, 2010
Protapes swenneni M. Huber, 2010
Protapes ziczac (Linnaeus, 1758)

References

Veneridae
Bivalve genera